Progeny may refer to:
A genetic descendant or offspring
Progeny Linux Systems, a defunct company which provided Linux platform technology
Progeny (Stargate Atlantis), an episode of the television series Stargate Atlantis
Progeny – a song on the Celtic Frost album Monotheist
Progenies of the Great Apocalypse, a 2003 song by Dimmu Borgir
The Progeny Of Flies – an album by Andrew Liles and Daniel Menche
Progeny (film), a 1998 movie about an alien abduction
Progeny, a short story from author Philip K. Dick
The Progeny, a title occasionally used to refer to Sophocles' lost play, the Epigoni
Progeny: Seven Shows from Seventy-Two, a 14-CD live box set from the English rock band Yes with a highlight set named Progeny: Highlights from Seventy-Two.
"Progeny" (Legends of Tomorrow), an episode of Legends of Tomorrow